Norman William Dobson (5 April 1925 – 2 March 2009) was a British sprint canoer who competed in the late 1940s. He was eliminated in the heats of the K-1 1000 m event at the 1948 Summer Olympics in London. Norman was a conscientious objector during the Second World War, for which he was imprisoned. After the war, Norman dedicated himself to the development of youth outdoor pursuits, and in 1951 became a volunteer instructor at the newly opened White Hall in Derbyshire, Britain’s first Local Education Authority Outdoor Centre. Norman earned his PhD in 1999 from the University of Leicester

References

Norman Dobson's profile at Sports Reference.com
Norman Dobson's PhD thesis

1925 births
2009 deaths
Canoeists at the 1948 Summer Olympics
Olympic canoeists of Great Britain
British male canoeists